Aq Kahriz (also Romanized as Āq Kahrīz and Āqkahrīz) is a village in Salehabad Rural District, Salehabad District, Bahar County, Hamadan Province, Iran. At the 2006 census, its population was 552, in 120 families.

References 

Populated places in Bahar County